In Greek mythology, Tisamenus (Ancient Greek: Τισαμενός) was a king of Thebes, son of Thersander and Demonassa, the daughter of Amphiaraus. When Thersander died on Mysia in the Trojan War, Peneleos acted as regent for Tisamenus until he came of age. Little is known about his rule. He was succeeded by his son Autesion.

Note

References 

 Pausanias, Description of Greece with an English Translation by W.H.S. Jones, Litt.D., and H.A. Ormerod, M.A., in 4 Volumes. Cambridge, MA, Harvard University Press; London, William Heinemann Ltd. 1918. Online version at the Perseus Digital Library
 Pausanias, Graeciae Descriptio. 3 vols. Leipzig, Teubner. 1903.  Greek text available at the Perseus Digital Library.

Theban kings
Kings in Greek mythology
Theban characters in Greek mythology